The Federation of Entertainment Unions (FEU) is a joint representative body based in the United Kingdom, representing workers in TV, theatre, film, music, gaming, cinema, publishing, new media, professional football and other performing arts.

The body was established in 1968 as the Confederation of Entertainment Unions.  In 1991, two of its larger members merged to form the Broadcasting, Entertainment, Cinematograph and Theatre Union (BECTU), and it was reconstituted under its current name.

As of 2017, FEU comprises what is now the BECTU section of Prospect along with, Equity, the Musicians Union, the National Union of Journalists, the Professional Footballers' Association, Unite and the Writers' Guild of Great Britain - around 130,000 members in total are in the relevant sections of these unions.

The FEU takes up issues that are of common interest among these unions, providing joint responses to policy consultations, offering jointly-managed training and campaigning services for members of those unions.

Presidents
1968: George Elvin
1970: Alan Sapper
1991: Position abolished

References

External links 
FEU Training
FEU documents lodged with the Certification Officer

Trade unions in the United Kingdom
Trade unions established in 1968